Hatfield is an unincorporated community in both Siskiyou County, California, and Klamath County, Oregon, in the United States. Hatfield is located at the junction of Oregon Route 39, California State Route 161, and California State Route 139; all three routes terminate at a four-way junction in the community. The Lost River also runs through Hatfield.

See also
Denio, Nevada
McDermitt, Nevada–Oregon

References

Unincorporated communities in California
Unincorporated communities in Klamath County, Oregon
Unincorporated communities in Siskiyou County, California
Unincorporated communities in Oregon